This is a list of islands of the Kingdom of Bahrain, which includes most of the archipelago known as the . The Kingdom consists of 33 natural islands and a number of man-made ones.

Islands
In addition to the Bahrain Islands, the Kingdom consists of:

 The Amwaj Islands, an artificial island chain which is already settled and in the final phase of construction.
 The Hawar Islands, split between Bahrain and Qatar, most of which were granted to Bahrain by an international court in 2001.
 The Jidda Islands consist of three deserted islands. This island is situated in the west side of Bahrain.
 The Nurana Islands consist of two islets. This island is situated in the east north side of Bahrain.
 The Reef Islands consist of 16 islands.

Former islands 
Islands that once existed but which now, because of land reclamation, are no longer separated from larger land masses:

 Arad Island, including Arad Fort, now joined to Muharraq.
 Halat Bu Maher, now joined to Muharraq
 Jazirat al Azl, now joined to Muharraq.
 Khasifeh or Khasifa
 Halat Seltah

See also 
 Bahrain Island
 Geography of Bahrain

Notes

References
 

 
Bahrain
Islands